is a Japanese web manga series written and illustrated by Itsutsuse. It was serialized in Kodansha's Magazine Pocket website from August 2020 to March 2022; it also started in Shōnen Magazine R in September of the same year. It moved from Magazine Pocket to the Suiyōbi no Sirius and YanMaga Web sites in March 2022. It also moved from Shōnen Magazine R to Monthly Maga Kichi in January 2023 An anime television series adaptation by Quad premiered in January 2023.

Characters

A high school boy who suddenly finds himself turned into an Akita Inu. He is taken in by his classmate Karen Inukai whom he has a crush on and lives together with her as her pet. Although he wishes to be turned back to human as soon as possible, he could not resist the charm of living his life as Inukai's dog. Later on in the series, he gains the ability to change between being a dog and a human.

Pochita's classmate when he was a human. She encounters Pochita on the street and takes him home with her. Even though she is usually cool and expressionless, she is a dog lover and likes to have skinship with Pochita.

Karen's childhood friend and Pochita's neighbor. She does not like dogs and is afraid of Pochita.

A girl attending the same school as Pochita. She likes to tease him when he was a human, but secretly has feelings for him.

Media

Manga
Written and illustrated by Itsutsuse, My Life as Inukai-san's Dog started in Kodansha's Magazine Pocket website on August 2, 2020. It also started publication in Shōnen Magazine R on September 20 of the same year. The manga stopped running on Magazine Pocket on March 17, 2022, and instead runs on the Suiyōbi no Sirius and YanMaga Web sites in addition to Shōnen Magazine R. On January 20, 2023, the series was transferred to the Monthly Maga Kichi website after the disbandment of Shōnen Magazine R. Kodansha has collected its chapters into individual tankōbon volumes. The first volume was released on November 9, 2020. As of November 16, 2022, seven volumes have been released.

Volume list

Anime
In March 2022, it was announced that the manga will receive an anime television series adaptation. The series is produced by Quad and directed by Takashi Andō, with Hisashi Saito serving as visual director, Kazuaki Morita designing the characters and serving as chief animation director, and Tatsuya Kikuchi composing the music. It premiered on January 7, 2023, on Tokyo MX and BS11. It will run for 12 episodes, with additional original video animations to be bundled with the first and second Blu-ray Disc volumes of the series. At Anime NYC 2022, Sentai Filmworks announced that they have licensed the series, and will be streaming it on Hidive. Medialink licensed the series in South and Southeast Asian territories.

Episode list

Notes

References

External links
 
 
 

2023 anime television series debuts
Anime series based on manga
Comics about dogs
Japanese webcomics
Kodansha manga
Romantic comedy anime and manga
Sentai Filmworks
Sex comedy anime and manga
Shōnen manga
Tokyo MX original programming
Webcomics in print